Joshua Beloya McNally (born February 20, 1995) commonly known as Joshua Beloya, is an American-Filipino football player currently playing as a striker for Ceres F.C. and the Philippines national team.

Club career
Beloya played for the youth team of FC Zürich in his early days. When he relocated to Bacolod, he joined Ceres FC and became part of the Bacolod selection which became the champions of the 2011 PFF National Men's U-23 Championship. He was then named the tournament's best striker after scoring 15 goals.

In early January 2012, he signed up for Kaya in the United Football League. He made his debut in the 1–0 win against Philippine Air Force in the opening match.

On April 1, 2013, it was announced that Global F.C. signed Beloya in an effort to beef up its lineup for the Asian Football Confederation President's Cup in May, 2013. He made his Global debut on April 2, 2013 in the 1–1 draw against the Loyola Meralco Sparks F.C. coming in as a substitute in the 85th minute for Ange Guisso.

International career
Beloya came to the attention of the Philippines national football team assistant coach in May 2011 when he scored 12 goals in five matches for his club Ceres FC. By September 2011, he joined the national team training pool and was named in the provisional Philippines under-23 squad for the 2011 Southeast Asian Games. During the tournament, he was noted as the player who scored the two late goals in the team's only winning match against Laos which ended 3–2. Beloya is also a member of the Philippine Dolphins, the Philippines national beach soccer team.

Personal life
Beloya was born in Olongapo to an American father and a Filipina mother. His father, Joe Lawrence McNally, was an American serviceman who died while Joshua was in his early childhood. His mother then remarried a Swiss citizen and moved to Switzerland, where he grew up until he and his mother relocated to Bacolod, the mother's hometown, in his mid-teens.

Honors
Ceres
PFF National Men's Club Championship: 2012–13, 2013–14

References

External links
 Joshua Beloya Kaya FC profile
 Joshua Beloya 2011 SEA Games athlete profile

1991 births
Living people
People from Olongapo
Filipino emigrants to Switzerland
Swiss people of American descent
Filipino people of American descent
American expatriate sportspeople in Switzerland
American soccer players
Filipino footballers
Sportspeople from Bacolod
Footballers from Negros Occidental
Association football forwards
American sportspeople of Filipino descent
Ceres–Negros F.C. players
Global Makati F.C. players
Stallion Laguna F.C. players
Kaya F.C. players
Filipino beach soccer players